Erode District is one of the 38 districts in the state of Tamil Nadu in India. It was the largest district by area in the state before the formation of Tirupur District in 2009. The headquarters of the district is Erode. It is divided into two revenue divisions, Erode and Gobichettipalayam, and is further subdivided into 10 taluks. Erode District was a part of Coimbatore District before its division into two on 17 September 1979.

History
The region belonging to present-day Erode District was ruled successively by several South Indian dynasties, including the Cheras, Cholas and Pandyas. During the first millennium, it was under the rule of the Chera Dynasty and various other rulers. Between the 10th to 12th centuries, the region was part of the larger Chola Empire. The region became part of Vijayanagara empire in the 14th century, then under the Nayaks of Madurai until the 17th century. Under the Madurai Nayaks, the Polygar system of administration was established. The Polygar system continued after the region became part of the Kingdom of Mysore in the mid-17th century.

The Polygar chieftain Dheeran Chinnamalai, a governor of the region, played a major role in the early struggle for Indian Independence in the late 18th-century Polygar Wars against the British East India Company. After the Polygar and Mysore Wars in the late 18th century, the area came under the control of the British until the achievement of Indian independence in 1947. It was a part of the erstwhile Coimbatore district until its split in 1979.

Demographics

According to the 2011 census, Erode District had a population of 2,251,744 with a sex-ratio of 993 females for every 1,000 males, above the national average of 929. A total of 195,213 were under the age of six, constituting 99,943 males and 95,270 females. Scheduled Castes and Scheduled Tribes accounted for 16.41% and 0.97% of the population, respectively. The literacy rate of the district was 66.29%, compared to the national average of 72.99%. The district had a total of 658,071 households. There were 1,195,773 workers: 173,376 cultivators, 331,414 main agricultural labourers, 48,960 in household industries, 557,301 other workers, 84,722 marginal workers, 38,798 marginal agricultural labourers, 5,362 marginal workers in household industries, 4,794 marginal cultivators and 35,768 other marginal workers.

At the time of the 2011 census, 81.76% of the population spoke Tamil, 10.32% Telugu, 5.40% Kannada and 1.14% Urdu as their first language.

Geography

To the north of Erode District lies Chamarajanagar district in Karnataka State. To the east, across the Kaveri River, lies Salem and Namakkal districts. To the southeast lies Karur district. Tirupur District lies immediately to the south. Coimbatore and Nilgiris districts lie to the west.

Erode District is landlocked, and is situated at between latitude 10 36" and 11 58" north and between longitude 76 49" and 77 58" east. The district forms the meeting point of the Western Ghats and Eastern Ghats mountain ranges, separated by the Moyar River.

The district comprises a long undulating plain, sloping gently towards the Kaveri River in the south-east. The three major tributaries of the Kaveri, the Bhavani, Noyyal and Amaravati, run across the long stretch of mountains in the north. In combination with these rivers, numerous canals, the Bhavanisagar Dam and the Kodiveri Dam provide irrigation and drainage for Erode.

Bhavani River 

The Bhavani River rises in the Western Ghats of the Silent Valley National Park in the Palakkad District of Kerala. It is joined by the Siruvani River, a perennial stream of Coimbatore District, and is joined by the Kundha River before entering Erode District in Sathyamangalam. The Bhavani is perennial river, mostly fed by the southwest monsoon but also supplemented by the northeast monsoon. It runs for over one hundred miles through Erode District, crossing Bhavani and Gobichettipalayam taluks. Near Gobichettipalayam lies the Kodiveri Dam, a mini-dam constructed for agricultural purposes.

The river eventually feeds the Bhavanisagar reservoir, and then takes an easterly course after crossing Sathyamangalam taluk. Along with another tributary, the Amutha Nathi River, the Bhavani River ultimately joins the Kaveri River in Bhavani, Tamil Nadu. A confluence of three rivers, such as this one, is known as a Triveni Sangam in Hindu belief. The place where the Bhavani River joins with the Kaveri River is famous for the Sri Sangameshwara Temple of Lord Shiva, where, in accordance to Hindu customs, people perform the last rites for deceased friends and family.

Kaveri River 

The Kaveri River rises in the Western Ghats of Kodagu (Coorg) District in Karnataka, and is joined by many small tributaries. It runs eastward through Karnataka, and is joined by its main tributary, the Kabini River, before taking a sharp southbound turn at Hogenakkal Falls. From here, it runs towards the southeast, forming the boundary between Bhavani taluk of Erode District and Tiruchengode taluk of the neighbouring Namakkal District. The Bhavani River joins the Kaveri River at the town of Bhavani.

Climate

Unlike nearby Coimbatore District, Erode District's climate is characterized by dry weather throughout the year, except during the break-in monsoon period, when it receives high rainfall. The cool, moist wind that passes through the Palghat Gap in the Western Ghats has a moderating effect on the climate of neighbouring Coimbatore district, but the air loses its coolness and becomes dry by the time it reaches Erode. Gunderipallam, Varattupallam are the highest rainfall (1200 MM) in this district.

Generally, the first two months of the year are pleasant, but in March the temperature begins to rise, which persists until the end of May, when the highest temperatures are normally recorded. The few rain showers during this period do not provide much relief from the heat. However, the temperature reverses its rising trend during the pre-monsoon period, between June and August. By September, the monsoon rains begin to fall. The northeast monsoon sets in vigorously during October–November. By December, the rains end, returning the climate to its dry and cold state.

But Erode distrtict receives water source form two rivers named Bhavani river and Kaveri river. These two rivers mingle at a point called Kooduthurai.

Politics 

|}

Administration

For administrative purposes, Erode District is divided into ten taluks under two revenue divisions.
 Erode division: Erode taluk, Kodumudi taluk, Modakurichi taluk, Perundurai taluk
 Gobichettipalayam division: Anthiyur taluk, Bhavani taluk, Gobichettipalayam taluk, Sathyamangalam taluk, Nambiyur taluk, Thalavadi taluk

Erode District consists of one municipal corporation and four other municipalities:
 Erode Municipal Corporation
 Gobichettipalayam Selection Grade Municipality
 Sathyamangalam Grade-I municipality
 Bhavani Grade-II municipality
 Punjai Puliampatti Grade-II municipality

Politics
Erode District is divided into three Parliamentary Constituencies of the Lok Sabha: Erode, Nilgiris and Tirupur. The district consists of eight Assembly Constituencies of the Tamil Nadu Legislative Assembly: Anthiyur, Bhavani, Bhavani Sagar, Erode East, Erode West, Gobichettipalayam, Modakurichi and Perundurai.

Economy

Agriculture is the most important source of income in Erode District. Paddy, plantain, silk, cotton, turmeric, coconut and sugarcane are some of the major products from agriculture and its associated industries.

Erode is the top turmeric producer in Tamil Nadu, making up 43% of statewide production. Erode is an important market centre for turmeric, being known as "Turmeric City." March 2019, turmeric from Erode received a Geographical Indication tag from the Geographical Indication Registry, making Erode Manjal Vanigarkal Matrum Kidangu Urimaiyalargal Sangam the registered proprietors of the Geographical Indication Erode Manjal (Erode Turmeric).

Erode is also the leading producer of plantain, coconuts and white silk in Tamil Nadu.

Gobichettipalayam is well known for its white silk, cotton, plantain and coconut production. Erode is one of the major producers of food products in the state. The country's first automated silk reeling unit is located near Gobichettipalayam.

Erode (city), Bhavani and Chennimalai are well known for handloom and powerloom textile products and ready-made garments. In 2005, Bhavani Jamakkalam (Bhavani Bedsheets) was registered as a Geographical Indication.

Anthiyur and Modachur (Gobichettipalayam) towns are famous for cattle.

Transport

The transportation system in Erode is well-developed. Erode, being a prominent trading center in Tamil Nadu, is well-connected with all modern means of transport, except air transport. The district is accessible by both road and rail from the state capital Chennai and other major cities. The district is divided into four Regional Transport Office (RTO) sub-divisions, namely Erode East (TN 33), Gobichettipalayam (TN 36), Perundurai (TN 56) and Erode West (TN 86). Gobichettipalayam RTO has two sub-offices, namely Bhavani (TN 36W) and Sathyamangalam (TN 36Z).

Railways
The district has one major railway station, Erode Junction. It was built by the British to connect the western and eastern coasts of India. There are ISO-certified diesel and electric locomotive sheds at Erode Junction. Erode Junction, which has the distinction of being the third cleanest railway junction in India, serves as the hub for water filling facilities and food provisions.

Roadways
The district is well-connected by road. The following is a list of major arterial roads:

National Highways
 NH-544 connecting Salem – Coimbatore – Cochin – Kanyakumari passes via Bhavani, Chithode and Perundurai
 NH-948 connecting Bangalore – Coimbatore passes via Sathyamangalam
NH-544H connecting Erode – Bhavani – Mettur Dam – Thoppur
 NH 381A connects Vellakoil on NH-81 with Erode and further to Sankagiri on NH-544.

Proposed Highways
 NH 67-A, connecting Karur – Erode
 NH 209-A, connecting Sathyamangalam – Gobichettipalayam – Erode
 
State Highways
 SH-15 connecting Erode – Gobichettipalayam – Sathyamangalam – Mettupalayam - Ooty
 SH-15A connecting Gobichettipalayam – Nambiyur – Avinashi
 
 SH-83A connecting Mettur – Erode – Arachalur  – Kangeyam – Dharapuram 
 SH-79 connecting Erode – Tiruchengode – Rasipuram – Attur
 SH-81 connecting Gobichettipalayam – Uthukuli – Kangeyam – Dharapuram
 SH-82 connecting Sathyamangalam – Athani – Bhavani
 SH-84 connecting Erode – Kodumudi – Karur
 SH-96 connecting Erode – Perundurai – Chennimalai – Kangeyam

The Tamil Nadu State Transport Corporation, headquartered at Erode (originally called as Jeeva Transport Corporation), serves inter- and intra-city routes. The State Express Bus Corporation (SETC) operates express bus services from Erode and Gobichettipalayam to major cities across the state. Erode Central Bus Terminus, which serves as a major hub, is one of the largest in the state. Due to its proximity to the states Karnataka and Kerala, Karnataka State Road Transport Corporation and Kerala State Road Transport Corporation buses also operate in the district.

Airways
The nearest airport is the Coimbatore International Airport located in the nearby Coimbatore district.

Waterways
Navigable waterways are available in the district at Nerinjipettai and Nattatreeswarar Temple.

Communication
The district is served by extensive postal, telegraph and telephone networks. The district is divided into two postal divisions, namely Erode and Gobichettipalayam. There are three head post offices at Erode, Bhavani and Gobichettipalayam, in addition to 319 other post offices. The district is serviced by almost all leading mobile phone operators in India.

Education
Erode district has several facilities for higher education. The district is divided into two educational districts, Gobichettipalayam and Erode. Former Chief Minister of Tamil Nadu Dr.M.G.Ramachandran started IRT Perundurai Medical College which is now renamed as Erode Medical College at Perundurai and an Engineering College "Institute of Road and Transport Technology" as the Automobile Research oriented Institute for the welfare of workers of Tamil Nadu State Transport Coorporation in 1984 which is now renamed as Government Engineering college, Erode. IRTT is one of the top 10 Government Engineering Colleges in Tamil Nadu. Other institutions include Erode Sengunthar Engineering College, Vellalar Institutions, Bannari Amman Institute of Technology, Kongu Engineering College, and Nandha college of technology.

Places of interest
Erode has many places of interest, attracting tourists from all over the state and other neighboring states. Notable ones include:

 Bargur hills, Anthiyur
 Bannari Amman Temple, Bannari
 Bhavanisagar Dam, Bhavanisagar
 Sangameswarar Temple, Bhavani
 Chennimalai Murugan temple, Chennimalai
 Kodiveri Dam, Gobichettipalayam
 Pachaimalai Subramanya Swamy Temple, Gobichettipalayam
 Pariyur Kondathu Kaliamman Temple, Gobichettipalayam
 Gobi boat house, Gobichettipalayam
 Kunderipallam Dam, Gobichettipalayam
 Sathyamangalam Tiger reserve
 Perumpallam dam, Sathyamangalam
 Government Museum, Erode
 Thindal Murugan Temple, Erode
 Vellode Birds Sanctuary, Erode
 Magudeshwarar Temple, Kodumudi
 Sadayappasamy Temple, kandasamypalayam
 Vijayamangalam Jain temple

Notable people
 

P. A. Venkatachalam (born 1934), professor, academician, researcher

Villages
 

K.G. Valasu
Kaliyur
RN Pudur

See also
List of districts of Tamil Nadu

References

External links

 Erode District

 
1979 establishments in Tamil Nadu
Districts of Tamil Nadu